Altium Designer (AD) is a PCB and electronic design automation software package for printed circuit boards. It is developed by Australian software company Altium Limited.

History 

Altium Designer was originally launched in 2005 by Altium, known at the time as Protel Systems Pty Ltd. It has roots back to 1985 when the company launched the DOS-based PCB design tool known as Protel PCB (which later emerged into Autotrax and Easytrax). Originally it was sold only in Australia. Protel PCB was marketed internationally by HST Technology since 1986. The product became available in the United States, Canada, and Mexico beginning in 1986, marketed by San Diego-based ACCEL Technologies, Inc. under the name Tango PCB. In 1987, Protel launched the circuit diagram editor Protel Schematic for DOS.

In 1991, Protel released Advanced Schematic and Advanced PCB 1.0 for Windows (1991–1993), followed by Advanced Schematic/PCB 2.x (1993–1995) and 3.x (1995–1998). In 1998, Protel 98 consolidated all components, including Advanced Schematic and Advanced PCB, into a single environment. Protel 99 in 1999 introduced the first integrated 3D visualization of the PCB assembly. It was followed by Protel 99 SE in 2000. Protel DXP was issued in 2003, Protel 2004 in 2004, Altium Designer 6.0 in 2005. Altium Designer version 6.8 from 2007 was the first to offer 3D visualization and clearance checking of PCBs directly within the PCB editor.

Features 
Altium Designer's suite encompasses four main functional areas, including schematic capture, 3D PCB design, field-programmable gate array (FPGA) development and release/data management. It integrates with several component distributors for access to manufacturer's data. It also has interactive 3D editing of the board and MCAD export to STEP.

File formats 

Altium Designer supports import  & export of various PCB and CAD data exchange file  formats.

Altium Designer is capable to import and export AutoCAD / and ISO STEP file formats.

See also 

 Comparison of EDA software
 List of free electronics circuit simulators

References

Sources*.sch

External links 
 Altium Designer Overview - PCB Design Tool
 What's New in Altium Designer

Electronic design automation software